The American Rocket Society (ARS) began its existence on , under the name of the American Interplanetary Society. It was founded by science fiction writers G. Edward Pendray, David Lasser, Laurence Manning, Nathan Schachner, and others. Pendray corresponded with Willy Ley of the German rocket society, Verein für Raumschiffahrt, and visited him in 1931. The members originally conducted their own rocket experiments in New York and New Jersey. The society printed its own journal. The AIS did pioneering work in testing the design requirements of liquid-fueled rockets, with a number of successful test launches of ARS rockets occurring in this period and pointing the way to the United States space program. In 1936, the American Rocket Society and its member Alfred Africano were awarded the Prix d'Astronautique by the Société astronomique de France (French Astronomical Society) in recognition of their pioneering tests with liquid fueled rockets.

The Journal of the American Rocket Society was published from 194553.

Membership increased rapidly in the 1950s as the government funded "upper air research", and by the end of the decade it had reached 21,000. In early 1963, the ARS merged with the Institute of the Aerospace Sciences to become the American Institute of Aeronautics and Astronautics (AIAA).

References and notes

Rocketry
1930 establishments in the United States
American Institute of Aeronautics and Astronautics
Scientific organizations established in 1930
Organizations disestablished in 1963